Thomas Paget may refer to:
Thomas Paget, 3rd Baron Paget (c. 1544–1590), English peer
Thomas Paget (Puritan minister) (died 1660), Puritan minister and controversialist
Thomas Paget, Lord Paget (1689–1742), English writer and politician
Thomas Paget (British Army officer) (died 1741), British Governor of Menorca
Thomas Paget (MP for Leicestershire) (1778–1862), British politician, MP for Leicestershire 1831–1832
Thomas Paget (MP for South Leicestershire) (1807–1892), British Liberal party politician
Thomas Guy Frederick Paget (1886–1952), known as Guy Paget, British soldier and Conservative Party politician
Thomas Humphrey Paget (1893–1974), British medallist and designer of coinage bearing George VI's portrait